The Haugean movement or Haugeanism was a Pietistic state church reform movement intended to bring new life and vitality into the Church of Norway which had been often characterized by formalism and lethargy. The movement emphasized personal diligence, enterprise and frugality.

Background
The Haugean movement took its name from the lay evangelist Hans Nielsen Hauge (1771–1824). It played an important part in nurturing the democratic folk movement of the time, and stimulating the entrance into politics of representatives of the rural population. It increased tensions between the more privileged classes and the common people, as well as between the clergy and the laity.

Hans Nielsen Hauge worked as a lay preacher at a time when such activity was forbidden by law.  The Conventicle Act of 1741 prohibited any religious meetings not authorized by the state church: a response to radical Pietism within Norwegian cities. The act decreed that religious gatherings could be held only under the supervision of a state approved minister of the Church of Norway. The pastor was thought to be the only person who could correctly interpret Christian teachings. The ministers had the sole right to administer the sacraments, and as a public official he was accountable to the state for the Christian indoctrination of his flock.

Hauge came to feel that he had a divine call which made it mandatory for him to break this law and proclaim the word of God directly among his fellowmen. He advocated a priesthood of all believers. He felt that people had to be awakened to a consciousness of their sins before they could begin to gain salvation through the grace of God. According to Hauge’s views, the State Church failed to provide parishioners with a personal religious experience. Hauge’s religious teachings were therefore viewed as attacks on the state church and its ministers.

Over a period of 18 years, Hauge published 33 books. Hauge traveled, mostly by foot, throughout much of Norway. Hauge was arrested several times and faced state persecution. He was imprisoned no less than fourteen times between 1794 and 1811, spending a total of nine years in prison. Upon his release from prison in 1811, he took up work as a farmer and industrialist at Bakkehaugen near Christiania (now Oslo). He later bought the Bredtvet farm (now the current site of Bredtvet Church in Oslo) where he lived out his life.

Impact
The teachings of Hauge had considerable influence with Norway.  Within commerce, many Haugeans launched industry initiatives, including mills, shipyards, paper mills, textile industry and printing house. Within political activities, three Haugeans – John Hansen Sørbrøden, Christopher Borgersen Hoen and Ole Rasmussen Apeness  –  were in attendance at the National Assembly at Eidsvoll in 1814.

Within popular culture, the character Solveig in Peer Gynt (1876) by Henrik Ibsen  is presented as a member of a Haugean family, and this religious affiliation is clearly related to her purity and steadfast love for the play's protagonist. Bjørnstjerne Bjørnson's work Synnøve Solbakken (1857) also presents the heroine as a Haugean with similar purity and commitment to her eventual betrothed, Thorbjørn. A vivid picture of Haugeans appears in the novels of Alexander Kielland. Adolph Tidemand portrayed Hauge and his followers in the painting Haugianerne (1852).

In September 1817 , a ship with 500 immigrants from Württemberg, Germany, including a number of Rappites (followers of Pietist separatist George Rapp), was forced to stop in Norway because of poor weather conditions. Staying in Bergen for about a year and provided with housing by the authorities, they were warmly accepted by the Haugeans. The two groups found much in common and held devotions together, with some of the Germans learning Norwegian during their stay. Samson Trae, a Haugean leader, noted that "It gave us extreme joy to realize that the foundation of your faith accords with the true word of God." After Rapp's followers left to settle in the United States, the two groups remained in contact for at least some time. In one letter, the Rappites stated, "Our hearts have often longed for your loving and edifying company since we came to America. We have longed more for Bergen than for Germany because of the love with which you received us and re-freshed us in body and spirit."

The influence of Hans Nielsen Hauge within Norway coincided with the years during which many Norwegians were immigrating to North America. The Haugean influence on Lutheranism in America has been considerable. For example, the first Norwegian Lutheran minister in the United States was a Haugean. Lutherans in the U.S. had a Hauge Synod, Eielsen Synod, and Lutheran Free Church all indicative of that influence. He is honored and his writings are studied by American Laestadians, also called Apostolic Lutherans. (Most Laestadian denominations did not merge.) Hauge is remembered on the liturgical calendar of the Evangelical Lutheran Church in America on March 29 as one of the renewers of the church.

See also
Religion in Norway
Läsare, a similar Pietistic movement in Sweden
Nyevangelism, a movement that had some influence on Haugeanism

References

Other sources
 Amundsen, Arne Bugge (1997) The Haugean Heritage – a Symbol of National History (from "In Search of Symbols. An Explorative Study" Jens Braarvig & Thomas Krogh,editors, pp. 214–233. Department of Cultural Studies, University of Oslo)
 Eielsen, Sigrid  (2000) A Haugean Woman in America : the Autobiography of Sigrid Eielsen (Norwegian-American Historical Association. Northfield, Minn., vol. 35)
 Gjerde,  S. S. & Ljostveit, P. (1941) The Hauge Movement In America  (The Hauge Inner Mission Federation)
Wee, Mons Olson (1919) Haugeanism: A Brief Sketch of the Movement and Some of Its Chief Exponents (Harvard University)

Related reading
Aarflot, Andreas (1979) Hans Nielsen Hauge, his life and message (Augsburg Publishing House, Minneapolis, MN.) 
Arnesen, Daniel (2001) Haugianske vennebrev (P. Øverland)  (Norwegian)
Bull, Jacob Breda (1912) Hans Nielsen Hauge (Kristania: Steen'ske Bogtrykkeri Og Forlag) 
Pettersen, Wilhelm (2008) The Light In The Prison Window: The Life Story of Hans Nielsen Hauge (Kessinger Publishing, LLC) 
Hauge, Alfred (1947) Hans Nielsen Hauge: Guds vandringsmann  (Ansgar)  (Norwegian)
Shaw, Joseph M. (1979) Pulpit Under the Sky: A Life of Hans Nielsen Hauge (Greenwood Press Reprint) 
Sjursen, Finn Wiig (1993) Den haugianske periode, 1796–ca. 1850 (NLA-forlaget)  (Norwegian)
 Thorvaldsen, Steinar  (2010) A Prophet Behind the Plough, Hans Nielsen Hauge and his Ministry (University of Tromsø)

External links
Luther Seminary: Hauge Synod
Hans Nielsen Hauges Minde



19th-century Lutheranism
Lutheran revivals
Lutheran theology
Christian movements
Lutheranism in Norway
Lutheranism in the United States